Barrow is an unincorporated community located in Greene County, Illinois, United States outside Roodhouse, just off Rt. 106.

History
In March 2006, Barrow was the victim of an F1 tornado.

Religion
The Barrow Baptist Church is located in Barrow.

References

External links
NACO-Green County
National Weather Service Forecast Office Lincoln, IL Central Illinois weather

Unincorporated communities in Greene County, Illinois
Unincorporated communities in Illinois